The little yellow flycatcher (Erythrocercus holochlorus) is a species of bird in the family Erythrocercidae.
It is found in Kenya, Somalia, and Tanzania.
Its natural habitats are subtropical or tropical moist lowland forest and subtropical or tropical moist shrubland.

References

little yellow flycatcher
Birds of East Africa
little yellow flycatcher
Taxonomy articles created by Polbot
Northern Zanzibar–Inhambane coastal forest mosaic